Martin Rowley was a professional golf caddie in the late 1980s and has been both secretary and chairman of the European Tour Caddies Association. He is now retired and lives a quiet life in rural Worcester with the aid of a mobility scooter.

A former Scholar of the world famous Repton school, he rubbed helmets with the likes of Aidrian Newey and Christian Horner, he has a passion for all sports and the values they bring to the people participating and the communities they live in.

Rowley was a regular feature on the PGA European Tour and was at Ian Woosnam's side during his successful captaincy at the 2006 Ryder Cup.

He has also worked with the following Ryder Cup players: Eamonn Darcy, Ken Brown, Darren Clarke and Miguel Ángel Jiménez. He currently caddies for Ian Garbutt and is behind golfnavigation.co.uk.

He now prefers regaling his audience with his extensive knowledge of public school affairs and golf adventures over a pint or ten in the various hostelries in Worcester.

Sources 
 BBC Sports Academy Profile
 Caddie is ready to pack his bags
 Caddies go up in the world

Caddies
Living people
Year of birth missing (living people)